KLAD may refer to:

 KLAD (AM), a radio station (960 AM) licensed to Klamath Falls, Oregon, United States
 KLAD-FM, a radio station (92.5 FM) licensed to Klamath Falls, Oregon, United States